Marreese Akeem Speights (born August 4, 1987) is an American professional basketball player who last played for the Guangzhou Loong Lions of the Chinese Basketball Association (CBA). He played college basketball for the Florida Gators, where he was a freshman member of their NCAA national championship team in 2007. The Philadelphia 76ers selected him with the 16th overall pick in the 2008 NBA draft.

Early life
Speights was born in St. Petersburg, Florida. He played basketball at St. Petersburg's Admiral Farragut Academy, which retired his jersey number after one year. He also played basketball at Hargrave Military Academy (senior year) and Gibbs High School.

Considered a four-star recruit by Rivals.com, Speights was listed as the No. 13 power forward and the No. 51 player in the nation in 2006.

College career
Speights began his career at the University of Florida in 2006–07, and averaged approximately four points and two rebounds in six minutes per game as a freshman for the national champion Gators. He saw few minutes behind big men Al Horford, Joakim Noah, and Chris Richard.

Speights ended the 2007–08 season averaging 14.5 points, 8.1 rebounds, and 1.4 blocks per game. After his sophomore season, he declared himself eligible for the 2008 NBA Draft. Speights confirmed with Florida coach Billy Donovan on June 12, 2008 that he would not be returning to the Gators.

Professional career

Philadelphia 76ers (2008–2012)
Speights was drafted by the Philadelphia 76ers with the 16th pick of the first round in the 2008 NBA Draft. He signed with Philadelphia on July 18, 2008. In his rookie season, Speights had a field-goal percentage of .502 from the field, playing 79 games, shooting .773 from the free throw line, and notching two starts.

Speights' second season with the 76ers started off on a high note, as he saw a slight increase in playing time and put up good numbers. He scored 15 or more points in five of his first 10 games, and was a vital part of the team's frontcourt. In the fourth quarter of the November 14 game versus the Chicago Bulls, Speights injured his left knee. An MRI revealed a partial tear of the medial collateral ligament (MCL). He missed 14 games and came back December 16, to play 22 minutes in a losing effort against the Cleveland Cavaliers. After Speights returned from the injury, his playing time became limited, mostly because of the increased production from Elton Brand.

The 76ers hired Doug Collins as their new head coach for the 2010-11 season. Known for his defensive-minded coaching philosophy, this shift in team focus adversely affected Speights, who was known more for his offensive capabilities. Frequent clashes with the coaching staff led to a career-low 11.5 minutes per contest. He did, however, get one start against the New Orleans Hornets on January 3, 2011 and notched 12 points and six rebounds. For the season, Speights averaged 5.4 points and 3.3 rebounds, both career lows.

Memphis Grizzlies (2012–2013)
On January 4, 2012, Speights was acquired by the Memphis Grizzlies as a part of a three-team trade that sent Xavier Henry to the New Orleans Hornets and two future second round picks to the Philadelphia 76ers.

On June 29, 2012, the Grizzlies extended a qualifying offer to Speights, making him a restricted free agent.

On July 13, 2012, Speights re-signed with the Grizzlies to a two-year, $8 million contract.

Cleveland Cavaliers (2013)

On January 22, 2013, Speights was traded to the Cleveland Cavaliers, along with Wayne Ellington, Josh Selby, and a future first round draft pick, in exchange for Jon Leuer. In his half a season with the Cavaliers, Speights averaged 10.2 points and 5.1 rebounds in 39 games.

Golden State Warriors (2013–2016)
On July 12, 2013, Speights signed with the Golden State Warriors. On February 10, 2014, Speights scored a career-high 32 points in a 123–80 win over the Philadelphia 76ers.

Speights won his first NBA championship with the Warriors after they defeated the Cleveland Cavaliers in the 2015 NBA Finals in six games. After being the team's top scoring option off the bench in 2014–15, he gained the nickname "Mo Buckets".

On June 29, 2015, the Warriors exercised his team option for the 2015–16 season.

During the 2015–16 season, Speights helped the Warriors record a 24–0 start to the season (an NBA record) and helped them finish 73–9, the best overall record in NBA history, surpassing the 1995–96 Chicago Bulls' mark of 72–10. In Game 3 of the Warriors' 2016 first-round playoff series against the Houston Rockets, Speights, who didn't attempt a three-pointer in the first 29 playoff games of his career, was 3-of-6 on three-pointers and finished with 22 points in a 97–96 loss. The Warriors went on to defeat the Rockets in five games. In the second round, Speights helped the Warriors defeat the Portland Trail Blazers in five games to qualify for the Western Conference Finals. In their conference finals match-up with the Oklahoma City Thunder, the Warriors fought back from a 3–1 deficit in the series to win clinch a 4–3 victory. In Game 5 of the series, Speights scored 14 points in 9 minutes to help the Warriors save their season. With a Game 7 victory, the Warriors moved on to the NBA Finals for the second straight year. The Warriors would again face the Cleveland Cavaliers. Despite the Warriors going up 3–1 in the series following a Game 4 win, they went on to lose the series in seven games to become the first team in NBA history to lose the championship series after being up 3–1.

Los Angeles Clippers (2016–2017)
On July 12, 2016, Speights signed with the Los Angeles Clippers. On January 16, 2017, he scored a season-high 23 points in a 120–98 win over the Oklahoma City Thunder. On May 23, 2017, Speights opted out of his contract for the 2017–18 season with the Clippers, making him an unrestricted free agent.

Orlando Magic (2017–2018)
On July 27, 2017, Speights signed with the Orlando Magic. On October 30, 2017, he scored 18 points and hit a career-high six 3-pointers, including five in a six-minute span, in a 115–99 win over the New Orleans Pelicans.

Guangzhou Loong Lions (2018–2021)
On July 2, 2018, the Guangzhou Loong Lions of the CBA announced the signing of Marreese Speights. On January 16, 2019, his import player roster spot was replaced by Cory Jefferson. On August 17, 2020, it was reported that the Guangzhou Long-Lions had re-signed with Speights.

NBA career statistics

Regular season

|-
| align="left" | 
| align="left" | Philadelphia
| 79 || 2 || 16.0 || .502 || .250 || .773 || 3.7 || .4 || .3 || .7 || 7.7
|-
| align="left" | 
| align="left" | Philadelphia
| 62 || 1 || 16.4 || .477 || .000 || .745 || 4.1 || .6 || .5 || .5 || 8.6
|-
| align="left" | 
| align="left" | Philadelphia
| 64 || 1 || 11.5 || .495 || .250 || .753 || 3.3 || .5 || .1 || .3 || 5.4
|-
| align="left" | 
| align="left" | Memphis
| 60 || 54 || 22.4 || .453 || .000 || .771 || 6.2 || .8 || .4 || .5 || 8.8
|-
| align="left" | 
| align="left" | Memphis
| 40 || 2 || 14.5 || .429 || .400 || .716 || 4.7 || .5 || .3 || .7 || 6.6
|-
| align="left" | 
| align="left" | Cleveland
| 39 || 1 || 18.5 || .457 || .200 || .806 || 5.1 || .7 || .4 || .7 || 10.2
|-
| align="left" | 
| align="left" | Golden State
| 79 || 3 || 12.4 || .441 || .258 || .821 || 3.7 || .4 || .1 || .4 || 6.4
|-
| style="text-align:left;background:#afe6ba;"| †
| align="left" | Golden State
| 76 || 9 || 15.9 || .492 || .278 || .843 || 4.3 || .9 || .3 || .4 || 10.4
|-
| align="left" | 
| align="left" | Golden State
| 72 || 0 || 11.6 || .432 || .387 || .825 || 3.3 || .8 || .3 || .5 || 7.1
|-
| align="left" | 
| align="left" | L.A. Clippers
| 82 || 2 || 15.7 || .445 || .372 || .876 || 4.5 || .8 || .3 || .5 || 8.7
|-
| align="left" | 
| align="left" | Orlando
| 52 || 3 || 13.0 || .395 || .369 || .727 || 2.6 || .8 || .2 || .4 || 7.7
|- class="sortbottom"
| style="text-align:center;" colspan="2" | Career
| 705 || 78 || 15.1 || .459 || .356 || .797 || 4.1 || .7 || .3 || .5 || 7.9

Playoffs

|-
| align="left" | 2009
| align="left" | Philadelphia
| 3 || 0 || 9.7 || .429 || .000 || .750 || 2.0 || .0 || .0 || .0 || 3.0
|-
| align="left" | 2011
| align="left" | Philadelphia
| 2 || 0 || 10.5 || .167 || .000 || .000 || 3.0 || .5 || .0 || .5 || 2.0
|-
| align="left" | 2012
| align="left" | Memphis
| 7 || 0 || 14.3 || .488 || .000 || .600 || 4.3 || .3 || .4 || .4 || 6.6
|-
| align="left" | 2014
| align="left" | Golden State
| 7 || 0 || 9.7 || .528 || .000 || .500 || 3.1 || .4 || .3 || .6 || 6.3
|-
| style="text-align:left;background:#afe6ba;"| 2015†
| align="left" | Golden State
| 10 || 0 || 6.7 || .333 || .000 || .600 || 2.1 || .4 || .4 || .3 || 3.7
|-
| align="left" | 2016
| align="left" | Golden State
| 24 || 0 || 8.4 || .390 || .419 || .774 || 2.0 || .5 || .1 || .3 || 5.6
|-
| align="left" | 2017
| align="left" | L.A. Clippers
| 7 || 2 || 14.0 || .432 || .350 || .700 || 2.9 || .4 || .3 || .4 || 6.6
|- class="sortbottom"
| style="text-align:center;" colspan="2" | Career
| 60 || 2 || 9.7 || .410 || .397 || .671 || 2.5 || .4 || .2 || .4 || 5.3

See also

 List of Florida Gators in the NBA

References

External links

1987 births
Living people
Admiral Farragut Academy alumni
African-American basketball players
American expatriate basketball people in China
Basketball players from St. Petersburg, Florida
Centers (basketball)
Cleveland Cavaliers players
Florida Gators men's basketball players
Golden State Warriors players
Guangzhou Loong Lions players
Los Angeles Clippers players
Memphis Grizzlies players
Orlando Magic players
Philadelphia 76ers draft picks
Philadelphia 76ers players
Power forwards (basketball)
American men's basketball players
Hargrave Military Academy alumni
21st-century African-American sportspeople
20th-century African-American people